The term economic census may refer to various censuses of economic activity. These include:

 Censo Económico (Mexico)
 Indian economic census
 United States Economic Census

Economics disambiguation pages